Plabita Borthakur is an Indian actress, singer and artist from Assam.

Early life
Her father Probin Borthakur was an engineer by profession with Oil India Limited along with being an Indian classical singer and teacher while her mother is a writer and poet. Her older sisters, Parineeta Borthakur and Priyangi Borthakur, are in the film industry as well. She grew up in the Oil India township of Duliajan in Assam, before moving to Mumbai's Jai Hind College, for higher studies. Professionally, she got her head start with numerous ad assignments and concerts with her band, Manu and Chow.

Career
Plabita Borthakur made her debut in PK in a blink and miss role as Anushka Sharma's sister. She is back with another Bollywood film, where she plays one of the main protagonists in the much spoken about, Lipstick Under My Burkha.

On 15 July 2017, she made a special appearance on The Kapil Sharma Show, alongside Prakash Jha and Ekta Kapoor.

Plabita has received rave reviews for her performance as a Muslim girl, Rehana Abidi in Lipstick Under My Burkha.

Her webseries, "What's Your Status" released in July 2018. She was part of an episodic web series on Zee5 called Parchhayee, that released on 24 June 2019.

In June 2019, the trailer of Doosra shows her in a pivotal role.

In 2020, she was in the critically acclaimed web-series Breathe: Into the Shadows on Amazon Prime Video. Plabita also starred in two feature films as Reena in Waah Zindagi and as Fauziya in Chhote Nawab.

In 2021, she starred as Ayesha in the web series Bombay Begums, directed by Alankrita Shrivastava, starring Pooja Bhatt, Amruta Subhash, Shahana Goswami and Aadhya Anand.

Filmography

Films

Web series

Awards and nominations

Music 
She is also an independent musician and part of a band called Manu and Chow. They have so far, released a couple of original songs and a Music video called "P".

References

External links
 
 

Living people
Female models from Assam
Actresses from Assam
Singers from Assam
People from Dibrugarh district
Indian film actresses
Indian television actresses
Indian web series actresses
Actresses in Hindi cinema
Actresses in Hindi television
Indian women singer-songwriters
Indian women pop singers
Assamese playback singers
Assamese-language singers
Bollywood playback singers
Year of birth missing (living people)
Jai Hind College alumni
21st-century Indian actresses
21st-century Indian women singers
21st-century Indian singers